The 1908 Northwestern Purple team represented Northwestern University during the 1908 college football season. In their first and only year under head coach Alton Johnson, and following a two-year hiatus in which Northwestern did not field a football team, the Purple compiled a 2–2 record (0–2 against Western Conference opponents) and finished in last place in the Western Conference.

Schedule

References

Northwestern
Northwestern Wildcats football seasons
Northwestern Purple football